Şensoy is a Turkish surname. Notable people with the surname include:

 Ferhan Şensoy, Turkish playwright, actor and stage director
 Hamdi Şensoy, Turkish architect
 Kemal Şensoy, Turkish politician
 Nabi Şensoy, Turkish diplomat
 Naci Şensoy, Turkish-Kosovar football manager
 Neşe Şensoy Yıldız, Turkish judoka
 Süleyman Şensoy, Turkish TASAM chairman
 Çağrı Şensoy, Turkish actor

Turkish-language surnames